The Amazon dwarf squirrel (Microsciurus flaviventer) is a chipmunk-sized tree squirrel native to South America.

Description
The fur varies from reddish to dull brown, fading gradually to yellow or greyish on the underparts. There is a distinctive patch of pale yellow fur behind the ears, while the tail has faint yellowish bands and white frosting.

The limbs are unusually long for tree squirrels. In the forelimbs, the humerus and radius are of equal length, an adaptation thought to increase the squirrel's ability to climb large trees, compensating for a lack of shoulder mobility. The longer hindlimbs allow for stronger muscles, so that the squirrel can leap over larger gaps, relative to its size, than more typically sized squirrels can.

Distribution and habitat
The squirrels are found in the upper Amazon Basin, broadly west of the Purus and Rio Negro rivers, in Brazil, Bolivia, Peru, Ecuador, and Colombia. They typically inhabit evergreen tropical rainforests at up to  elevation, although they may sometimes be found in more disturbed habitats.

Subspecies
Eight subspecies of Amazon dwarf squirrel are currently recognised:

Biology and behaviour
The squirrels use all levels of the forest, from the ground to the tree canopy, but are most commonly found in the understory. They feed on arthropods, tree bark, and fungi, and have been observed to closely follow flocks of birds while foraging, although the reason for this is unclear. They are diurnal and highly arboreal, even for tree squirrels, frequently jumping from branch to branch. They spend the night in nests formed from plant fibres, and located several metres above the ground.

They are mostly solitary, but may be found with others feeding on the same tree. Their calls include a bird-like "trill" and a series of soft "chucks" used as an alarm call. Very little is known of their reproduction, although litters are thought to be small.

References

Bibliography
 Tirira, Diego. 2006. Mamíferos del Ecuador, Diversidad: Microsciurus flaviventer (Gray, 1867). Page on internet (Enero 2006). Version 1.1. Ediciones Murciélago Blanco. Quito. Mamiferos del Equador  Checked on: fecha de visita (2009-03-17)

External links
 Animal Diversity Web

Microsciurus
Rodents of South America
Mammals of Brazil
Mammals of Colombia
Fauna of the Amazon
Mammals described in 1867
Taxa named by John Edward Gray